This is a partial list of molecules that contain 21 carbon atoms.

See also
 Carbon number
 List of compounds with carbon number 20
 List of compounds with carbon number 22

C21